Suehendley Barzey (born 24 July 1989) is a Bonairean footballer who plays for the Bonaire national team. With three international goals, Barzey is Bonaire's joint all-time top goal scorer since joining CONCACAF in 2013, along with Yurick Seinpaal and Jermaine Windster.

Club career
From 2007 to 2015, Barzey played for SV Juventus in the Bonaire League. In 2015, he began playing for TAC '90 of the Eerste Klasse, the sixth tier of football in the Netherlands. He was one of the league's top scorers in his first season with the club with 8 goals. In November 2016, he was suspended by the KNVB for 36 months and dismissed from the club immediately after being involved in a physical altercation with an assistant referee during a match against Alphense Boys.

In summer 2019, Papa Barzey joined amateur side Hercules.

International career
On 14 November 2013, Barzey made his international debut for Bonaire against Suriname in the 2013 ABCS Tournament.  This match was also Bonaire's official debut after being accepted as a member of CONCACAF and the CFU in April 2013. Two days later, Barzey scored his first international goal, the game-winner, as Bonaire defeated Aruba in the third place match.  In May 2014, Barzey was named to Bonaire's roster for 2014 Caribbean Cup qualification, the first CONCACAF tournament in which they took part after becoming a member. During qualification, Barzey scored his first competitive goal for Bonaire on 5 September 2015 in a second round victory over Suriname.

International goals
Scores and results list Bonaire's goal tally first.

International career statistics

References

External links
 Caribbean Football Database profile
 

Living people
Association football forwards
Bonaire international footballers
1989 births
Bonaire footballers